Nokia 6600 generally refers to the mobile phone released in 2003. It may also refer to:

 Nokia 6600 slide
 Nokia 6600 fold
 Nokia 6600i slide